Teleperformance SE (TP) is an omnichannel company headquartered in France. The company provides customer acquisition management, customer care, technical support, debt collection, social media services, and other services. It operates in 91 countries and serves 170 markets.

There has been some debate about its use of video monitoring of its employees that are remote workers.

Key figures
Company revenue totaled €8.154 billion in 2022.  Their services are operated in over 300 languages and dialects on behalf of companies in various industries.

History

Formation and early years

Daniel Julien created Teleperformance in Paris in June 1978. In 1986, Teleperformance established its first international subsidiaries in Belgium and Italy. Two years later, Teleperformance launched subsidiaries in other European markets: Spain, Germany, Sweden and the United Kingdom. In 1989, Daniel Julien and Jacques Berrebi joined forces at the head of Rochefortaise Communication, the parent company of Teleperformance International listed on the Paris Stock Exchange. Ten years later, Rochefortaise Communication and Teleperformance International merged to form SR. Teleperformance. This company became Teleperformance in 2006.

Expansion
In 1993, Teleperformance USA was established, beginning its contact center operations in the United States. In 1996, Asia-Pacific contact centers were developed, with operations set up in the Philippines and Singapore. The Group was significantly expanded in Europe through numerous acquisitions and company start-ups in Switzerland, Norway, Denmark, Greece, Spain, the Netherlands and Finland. From 1998 through 2002, the Teleperformance network expanded throughout the Americas, into Argentina, Brazil and Mexico.

In 2003, Teleperformance became the world's second largest contact center outsourcer in terms of revenue. In 2005, Teleperformance's revenues exceeded 1 billion EUR for the first time. In 2006, they acquired Teleperformance Russia. In 2006 Teleperformance USA purchased AOL's 400-employee call center in Ogden, Utah. This purchase was the 23rd call center which the company purchased until this time.

In 2007, Teleperformance acquired 100% interest in Twenty4help, the European technical support leader; AllianceOne, a leading US accounts receivable management company; and Hispanic Teleservices, a contact center service provider with operations based in Mexico. In parallel, Teleperformance acquired the company TPH Services Telecoms, and several SFR sites. In 2008, the group's operations and strategy were centralized for management under the responsibility of Daniel Julien and Jacques Berrebi. Teleperformance acquired The Answer Group.

In 2010, Teleperformance acquired Scottish outsourcing call center 'beCogent' for £35 million. which ceased operations December 2021 mainly due to the impact of the Covid 19 virus and employees working from home. In 2012, Teleperformance opened 5 multilingual, multi-cultural hubs to serve Europe and other markets. By 2013 Teleperformance had six contact centers in Tunisia. In 2013, Teleperformance acquired full control of TLS Contact. In 2014, Teleperformance acquired Aegis USA Inc., a major outsourcing and technology company in the United States, the Philippines and Costa Rica. The transaction was approved by regulatory authorities. From 2014 to 2016, Teleperformance created and/or opened fifteen new centers worldwide. These included centers in the United States, Canada, the United Kingdom, Indonesia, China, the Philippines, Guyana, Portugal, Colombia, Surinam, Dubai, Albania, Egypt, Australia and Lithuania. In January 2019, Teleperformance announced a second premises in Cairo. In March 2015 the company announced the opening of a new offshore facility in Paramaribo, Surinam. The multichannel contact center offers support to Benelux clients in Dutch.

In May 2016 Teleperformance announced the opening of a contact center in Australia. The center has 300 workstations and is located in Burwood, Victoria, about 16 kilometers outside of Melbourne. The company announced in July 2016 its plans to expand to Bristol, Tennessee in the United States, creating 500 jobs within the coming five years. In August 2016 Teleperformance purchased California-based LanguageLine Solutions LLC for $1.52 billion from a US-based private equity firm, Abry Partners. In June 2018, Teleperformance announced it would acquire Intelenet for $1 billion. The acquisition was concluded on 5 October 2018.

In October 2020, Teleperformance announced it would acquire Health Advocate. The acquisition was concluded on 22 June 2021. On 28 December 2021, Teleperformance acquired Senture.

In October 2022, Teleperformance announced that acquired PSG Global Solutions, a leader in digital recruitment process outsourcing (“RPO”).

Governance
Jacques Berrebi announced his plans to retire in January 2008. He ended all his operational duties as of 5 January 2009.

In 2012, Jacques Berrebi, co-founder with Daniel Julien of Teleperformance Group, retired at the age of 70.

Paulo César Salles Vasques was announced as the new chief executive officer of the group and Daniel Julien remained as the chairman of the board.

In October 2017, after the resignation of Paulo César Salles Vasques, Daniel Julien, who remains executive chairman of the board, was also appointed by the board of directors as group chief executive officer.

Cloudshoring

In 2019, Teleperformance introduced Cloudshoring as part of its smart-shoring options, which comprises a network of centralized hubs worldwide that enable teams to work virtually regardless of geographies.

Cloudshoring facilitates flexibility, scalability, and the sourcing of employees from anywhere in the world. Teleperformance Cloud Campus is Teleperformance's global virtual workforce platform for Cloudshoring that supports all industries and geographies using cloud-based technologies with centralized support tools.

Its capabilities include virtual human resource services such as talent acquisition, training, coaching, career advancement opportunities, team building, and employee engagement. On the operational side, its capacities include quality control, advanced data security, agent performance, and client interaction where the teams remain socially engaged and connected through virtual activities and interactive events.

Cloudshoring promotes a globalized connected and more ecological concept based on the fact that Virtual teams can “work anywhere,” eliminating geographic boundaries and complementing onshore, nearshore, and offshore strategies to attain the optimal balance between resilience, efficiency, and cultural proximity. 

In 2022, around 50% of Teleperformance employees worldwide were remote workers.

Technology
In 2016, the company developed the e-Performance Hub, a technology that allows the company to better meet the demands of its omnichannel strategy.

Teleperformance was awarded a US patent on 5 May 2015, for “securely and efficiently processing telephone orders” through a new technology called ESP™. ESP™ accelerates the entry speed of confidential consumer data, while simultaneously securing the information capture process.

In February 2015 Teleperformance announced the opening of the first virtual contact center in the Middle East and Africa. Located in Dubai's Internet City, the facility will be a virtual contact center connecting UAE-based regional and other international clients with Teleperformance Egypt's contact center in Cairo.

Teleperformance was a commercial partner in the “Sensei Project” which was developed in 2016 to predict the outcome of the “Brexit” vote in the UK using data-mining of social media chatter.

In October 2019, Teleperformance inaugurated the Teleperformance Innovation Experience Center (T.I.E.C.) in Santa Clara, California.

In May 2022, Teleperformance held a ground-breaking Games and Esports convention, featuring several panels of experts with discussions on Esports, Games, Metaverse and Web 3.0, at Teleperformance's first Global Esports Arena and Metaverse Centre of Excellence, located in Lisbon, Portugal.

Certifications
Teleperformance was recognized as one of the best companies to work for in Brazil in 2015,  Dominican Republic, El Salvador, India, and Mexico. Teleperformance was recognized by the 2015 Aon Hewitt Best Employers Program. The company achieved certification in ten countries around the world, including China, India, Portugal, Albania, Slovakia, Ukraine, Switzerland, Chile, Egypt and Lebanon. The company was ranked fourth among India's “Best Workplaces”. Teleperformance was recognized by the Great Place to Work Institute as one of 25 of the Best Companies to work for in Latin America in 2016.

Teleperformance in El Salvador, China, Albania, and India were recognized as Aon Best Employer. Great Place to Work Institute certified Teleperformance in El Salvador in 2017 and Dominican Republic as a Great Place to Work®. Teleperformance in Mexico was recognized as one of the top 25 best companies to work for in the country, while Teleperformance in Portugal was named Best Workplace.

In 2018, Teleperformance received Binding Corporate Rules (BCRs) approval for both Controller and Processor from the French Data Protection Authority, CNIL, making Teleperformance the first company in the industry to attain this critical data protection compliance status in the European Union.

Teleperformance received the enterprise-wide Social Responsibility Standard (SRS) Certification Award from Verego for the sixth consecutive year.

In December 2021, Teleperformance had been certified in 60 countries as a "Best Employer" by independent experts like Great Place to Work®. These certifications cover 98% of Teleperformance's global workforce. This extensive certification is one reason why Teleperformance was named in October 2021 one of the 25 World's Best Workplaces™ across all industries by Fortune magazine, in partnership with Great Place to Work®.

In 2022, Teleperformance was named one of the 25 World’s Best Workplaces™ in 2022 by Fortune and Great Place to Work® for the second consecutive year and scores industry best global ranking. This certification came after Teleperformance being certified in 64 countries as a Great Place to Work®.

Corporate culture
	
Teleperformance has been repeatedly criticized for privacy violations, surveillance, as well as extremely stressful working conditions for its workers.

Social responsibility
Teleperformance Philippines, in partnership with its CSR arm, the Citizen of the World Foundation, (COTW), helped to relocate victims of the 2009 Ondoy typhoon flood, establishing the Teleperformance Gawad Kalinga Village in 2010. By August 2013 the new neighborhood had 50 homes and a SIBOL Day Care Center, an IT Learning Center, and more. The 3rd Anniversary of the relocation took place on 17 August, and was led by Teleperformance Asia Pacific President David Rizzo, and others.  By December 2014 the company completed the construction of new homes for 100 displaced families in the village in Tanay, Rizal.

On 24 November 2014 Teleperformance, together with Feed the Children, distributed enough food and other necessities to assist 400 needy families in the Fairborn, Ohio area.

At the end of 2015 Teleperformance USA partnered with Delete Blood Cancer DKMS offering bone marrow donor registration to employees. As a result, close to 1,400 employees joined the national bone marrow registry.

In Lisbon, Portugal, in July 2016, Teleperformance held an event to promote and support young Portuguese athletes.

In 2020, Teleperformance CEO Daniel Julien made a personal donation to Feed the Children.

In 2022, Teleperformance partnered with One Tree Planted, by funding the plantation of 500,000 trees in Asia, Europe and the Americas to continue its commitment to environmental awareness and action. During 2022, Teleperformance was also recognized for reducing carbon emissions on joining the Vérité40 index.

Labor dispute and settlement
In 2008 a class action lawsuit was filed against Salt Lake City-based Teleperformance USA seeking unpaid wages for employees, alleging a violation of the Fair Labor Standards Act. On 19 May 2010, a settlement was reached for approximately $2 million to be paid to 15,862 workers in 10 US states.

References

External links
Global website
India website
LanguageLine Solutions

Companies based in Paris
Business services companies established in 1978
1978 establishments in France
Business process outsourcing companies
Companies listed on Euronext Paris
CAC 40